Stacy Francis is an American singer and actress. She is best known for being a part of the girl group Ex Girlfriend and as a contestant in the first season of The X Factor USA. Francis has also made several television appearances on various shows. She also performed for Tom Cruise at his 40th birthday. Stacy participated in the nineteenth series of the UK television show Celebrity Big Brother as a "new star" housemate.

Early life
Francis is the daughter of an Italian American father and African American mother.

Career

1991–1994: Ex Girlfriend

In 1991, Francis joined a female group called Ex Girlfriend. Managed by the group Full Force to be their female counterpart, the group was 
signed to Forceful Records; a division of Reprise Records. Ex Girlfriend released their debut album X Marks the Spot in October 1991. The first single "Why Can't You Come Home" peaked in the top-five on Billboard's Hot R&B/Hip-Hop Songs chart. The success of the single invited them to perform on various TV shows including Soul Train. In August 1994, they released their second album It's a Woman Thang. Following the poor sales and management, Ex Girlfriend broke up in 1995.

1992–2009: Broadway debut and acting career
In 1992, Francis starred in an off-Broadway musical production of Mama, I Want To Sing!. Francis portrayed the lead role of Doris Winter, a character whose life is based on American singer Doris Troy. Francis remained with the production until 1996. During her time with the production in 1995, a soundtrack (titled Mama, I Want to Sing – 1995 Original London Cast) was released which features Francis, Troy, and Chaka Khan.

In October 1998, Francis starred in the Broadway production of Footloose. Playing the role of "Rusty", Francis performed lead vocals on "Somebody's Eyes" and "Let's Hear It for the Boy" while also sharing lead vocals on "Holding Out for a Hero" and "Footloose (Finale)". The songs were released on the Footloose the Musical (1998 Original Broadway Cast) in 1999. In 2000, she made a guest appearance as "Val" in two episodes of the American crime drama television series Third Watch. In 2001, she played "Carrie" in the episode of "Zol Zein Gezint" for the medical drama series Strong Medicine. In the same year, she made a guest appearance as "Maureen" in the American sitcom Yes, Dear.

In 2002, Francis guest-starred in Son of the Beach, Fastlane, and movie In My Opinion. In 2003, she made a guest appearance in the American comedy sitcom Half & Half for the episode "The Big Phat Mouth Episode: Part 2" as the sarcastic receptionist "Regina". In 2004, Francis appeared as "Miss Hanks" in the first season of Phil of the Future. In 2005, she appeared as "Shelby" in the independent romance film Friends and Lovers.

2011: The X Factor
In 2011, Francis auditioned for the first season of The X Factor USA in front of judges L.A. Reid, Paula Abdul, Cheryl Cole and Simon Cowell. She sang Aretha Franklin's "(You Make Me Feel Like) A Natural Woman" and received four yeses. At the beginning of bootcamp, she revealed that her father had just died. She made it through bootcamp and to judges' houses, where she was mentored by Nicole Scherzinger. She was eliminated in week 4 after ending up in the bottom 2 with Astro as Reid, Abdul and Cowell kept Astro. However, Francis received more votes than Astro meaning if Cowell sent the result to deadlock, Astro would’ve been eliminated.

2015–2017: The Stacy Francis Show and Celebrity Big Brother
In February 2015, Francis began her own talk show "The Stacy Francis Show". The episodes are uploaded via the show's YouTube account. She also joined the cast of the third season for the TVOne series R&B Divas: Los Angeles.

In January 2017, Francis became a new star housemate on Celebrity Big Brother 19 in the United Kingdom. She finished in 11th place.

2018–present: Recent activities
In 2018, Stacy signed to a global artist agency in London. She also released a single called "Into My Eyes", which featured American singer Brandy Norwood. Francis is currently working on West End in London.

Philanthropy 
In 2020 Stacy released her new song We Stand Together. In partnership with American Power and Gas. The company has fed over one million meals and is now partnering with Stacy and her family's Church The Universal Church of God to feed the Brownsville community where she grew up.

In 2021 Stacy Francis and the artist Alex Righetto, her life partner founded The Stacy Francis Music, Art & Education Foundation, with the purpose to give a future and the right to dream to those who have fewer opportunities. Giving food but also offering education and sustainability.

Discography 
Singles
 2012: "Purple Rain"
 2012: "I Am the Change"
 2015: "I Still Believe"
 2018: "Into My Eyes"
 2020: "We Stand Together"
 2022: "Eco Echo Earth Song"

Filmography

Film

Television

References

External links 
 
 
 

1979 births
Living people
20th-century American actresses
20th-century American singers
21st-century American actresses
21st-century American singers
African-American activists
African-American actresses
African-American women singer-songwriters
African-American singer-songwriters
American women singer-songwriters
African-American pianists
American sopranos
American film actresses
American hip hop singers
American multi-instrumentalists
American music arrangers
American people of Italian descent
American philanthropists
American rhythm and blues keyboardists
American rhythm and blues singer-songwriters
American soul keyboardists
American soul singers
Rhythm and blues pianists
Singers with a five-octave vocal range
The X Factor (American TV series) contestants
American contemporary R&B singers
20th-century American women singers
21st-century American women singers
20th-century American pianists
21st-century American pianists
20th-century women pianists
21st-century women pianists